Corymbophanes ameliae is a species of armored catfish native to South America where it is known only from the Kuribrong River in Guyana.

References

Ancistrini
Catfish of South America
Fish of Guyana
Fish described in 2019